Rtyně v Podkrkonoší is a town in Trutnov District in the Hradec Králové Region of the Czech Republic. It has about 2,900 inhabitants.

Geography
It lies on the border between the Giant Mountains Foothills and Broumov Highlands. The Rtyňka stream flows through the town.

History
Rtyně was probably founded in the late 13th century. The first written mention of Rtyně is from 1367 when it used to be one of the biggest agricultural communities in the region. The way of living changed a lot in the 16th century when coal mining in this region started, although the agriculture did not lose its importance.

Peasants used to keep an important position in Rtyně, which was proved by a peasant uprising in 1775. Coal mining as well as the uprising is remembered in the exposition of the town museum.

In 1931, the village's name was changed to Rtyně v Podkrkonoší. In 1978, it gained town status.

Economy
The largest employer based in the town is Joyson Safety Systems, a manufacturer of automotive safety systems.

Culture
Since 1962, the town hosts an annual concert band festival. The town is also the seat of the Koletova hornická hudba Concert Band, which was founded in 1864 and is the host band for the annual band festival.

Sights

The most valuable building and symbol of the town is a wooden bell tower from 1592. It is unique in shape and construction. It is located next to the Church of Saint John the Baptist. In front of the church there is a statue of King David by Matthias Braun. Due to poor condition, the original from 1738 was replaced by a copy.

Twin towns – sister cities

Rtyně v Podkrkonoší is twinned with:
 Elstra, Germany
 Jelcz-Laskowice, Poland

References

External links

Cities and towns in the Czech Republic